A tea party is a social gathering event held in the afternoon. For centuries, many societies have cherished drinking tea with a company at noon. Tea parties are considered for formal business meetings, social celebrations or just as an afternoon refreshment.

Originally, in a tea party, loose leaf tea was provided in a teapot along with milk and sugar. Variety of food including sandwiches, scones, cakes, pastries and biscuits were served alongside tea in a tiered arrangement. Food served in tea parties was according to a particular season. People typically consumed solid foods in winter and fruit and berries during summer and spring seasons.   

Formal tea parties are generally characterised by the use of prestige utensils, such as porcelain, bone china or silver. Tables may be set with napkins and matching cups and plates. 

In the past, afternoon tea parties were hosted regularly. Whereas, presently tea parties are becoming like social gathering events in high tea restaurants where tea and food is presented in a traditional manner.

History

Formal teas
Queen Victoria reportedly ordered "16 chocolate sponges, 12 plain sponges, 16 fondant biscuits" along with other sweets for a tea party at Buckingham Palace. The afternoon tea party became a feature of great houses in the Victorian and Edwardian ages in the United Kingdom and the Gilded Age in the United States, as well as in all continental Europe (France, Germany, and the Russian Empire). The formal tea party still survives as an event, as in the  debutante teas of some affluent American communities.

Traditionally, servants stayed outside the room until needed. This was due to the rigidity of social conventions and also reflected the intimate nature of the afternoon tea. Proving the truth of 18th-century author Henry Fielding's quip that "love and scandal are the best sweeteners of tea", the custom of banning servants from the drawing room during tea shows the hostess's desire to encourage free conversation among her guests. Most of the formalities of that age have disappeared, particularly since World War II, when economic changes made household servants a rarity, but afternoon tea can still provide a good opportunity for intimate conversation and a refreshing light meal.

Queen Elizabeth II's  favorite tea cakes were honey and cream sponge and chocolate biscuit cake. Tea sandwiches might include smoked salmon, egg mayonnaise or ham and mustard among other offerings. Crustless triangle shaped tuna sandwiches can be served on buttered loaves with thinly sliced cucumbers.

"Kettle drums"

"Kettle drums" came about in 18th and 19th centuries and are informal large afternoon parties for tea. At kettle drums, guests traditionally came for short periods and left at will, mingled and conversed with little formality, and partook of tea, chocolate, lemonade, cakes, and sandwiches. Guests were expected to dress for ordinary daytime visiting, but not more formally.

Per false folk etymology, the name "kettle drum" is said to have originated in the informal tea gatherings hosted by British camp officers' wives during East India Company rule or the British occupation of India, during which kettle drums are claimed to have served as tea tables in the camps. Alternatively, "kettle drum" may have been an amalgam of "drum" — 18th-century slang for a vivacious party — and "kettle" for the tea served.

Etiquette 
Tea party etiquette depends on the customs and accepted standards of behaviour of a given time period and place. 1900 etiquette demonstrated etiquette to be linked with conservative and rigid gender roles. Manners were of utmost importance in the proper conduct of men and women in early tea parties.  

There are several rules of etiquette noted during the 19th and 20th centuries. Various rules of etiquette included:

 Learn to be patient
 Restrain your temper
 Refrain from speaking in anger
 Silence is more valuable than speech

Children's parties
Tea parties are sometimes hosted by young children where the guests consist of stuffed animals, dolls, friends (both real and imaginary) and family members.

Alice's Tea-Party

In Lewis Carroll's Alice's Adventures in Wonderland, in the chapter "A Mad Tea-Party", Alice becomes a guest at a tea party along with the March Hare, the Hatter, and a sleeping Dormouse who remains asleep for most of the chapter. The other characters give Alice many riddles and stories, including the famous 'Why is a raven like a writing desk?'. The Hatter reveals that they have tea all day because time has punished him by eternally standing still at 6 pm (tea time). Alice becomes insulted and tired of being bombarded with riddles and she leaves, claiming that it was the stupidest tea party that she had ever been to.

Global analogs
Yum cha is the Chinese equivalent of a tea party, usually held in a restaurant.

The German "Kaffeeklatsch", literally "coffee gossip", is an afternoon gathering – stereotypically of housewives – in which coffee  or tea is drunk, cakes are eaten, and gossip is exchanged.

See also

 British tea culture
 Coffee break
 Japanese tea ceremony
 Tea
 Tea ceremony

 Tea culture
 Tea dance
 Tea sandwich
 Tea set

References
Notes

Further reading
 Dawn L. Campbell, The Tea Book (1995), Pelican Publishing, Louisiana. 
 Joanna Isles, A Proper Tea (1987), Johnson Editions Ltd, 
 Helen Simpson, The London Ritz Book of Afternoon Tea: The Art and Pleasures of Taking Tea, (1986) Angus & Robertson Publishers, North Ryde and London,

External links
 Woburn Abbey - origin of Afternoon Tea

Eating parties
Party
High society (social class)